Ļaudona Parish is an administrative unit of Madona Municipality in the Vidzeme region of Latvia. Until 2009, it was part of the defunct Madona District.

Towns, villages and settlements of Ļaudona parish 
 Ļaudona

References 

Parishes of Latvia
Madona Municipality
Vidzeme